George Miller House may refer to:

George H. Miller House, Bloomington, Illinois, listed on the National Register of Historic Places (NRHP)
George Miller House (Peewee Valley, Kentucky), NRHP-listed in Oldham County, Kentucky
George Tambling Miller and Ninette Stocker Miller House, Hillsboro, New Mexico, listed on the National Register of Historic Places (NRHP)
George Miller House (Stehekin, Washington), Stehekin, Washington, listed on the National Register of Historic Places (NRHP)